Al Hazm or al-Hazm is the principal town of Al Jawf Governorate and Al Hazm District in Yemen. It is located northwest of the city of Marib and southeast of Saada. In the late 1980s a highway was built through Al Hazm, leading to Baraqish and Ma'in to the south to Marib. Yemen was reported by OPEC to have received a $5m loan for the road project on May 11, 1987. It is served by Al Hazm Airport. On March 1, 2020, the city was captured by the Houthis during the al-Jawf offensive.

Its population was 16,044, according to the 2004 national census.

In August 2022, heavy rains caused flooding that destroyed six homes and damaged 20.

Climate
In Al Hazm, the climate is hot and dry. Most rain falls in the winter. The Köppen-Geiger climate classification is Bwh. About  of precipitation falls annually.

References

Populated places in Al Jawf Governorate